Kyllikki (subtitled Three Lyric Pieces for Piano), Op. 41, is a composition written for piano by Jean Sibelius in 1904. Although the title is taken from the Kalevala, Sibelius' piece has no programmatical base in the national epic.

Movements

The work consists of three movements:

 Largamente – Allegro
 Andantino
 Commodo

A typical performance lasts about 12 minutes.

References

External links

Compositions by Jean Sibelius
Compositions for solo piano
1904 compositions